Vasile Conta (November 15, 1845 – April 21, 1882) was a Romanian philosopher, poet, and politician.

He was born in Ghindăoani, a village in Bălțătești commune, Neamț County.

He died in Bucharest.

Antisemitism

He was the true founder of the Romanian ideological antisemitism.
 His criteria were no longer those of a socioeconomic nature; they were derived from the "nationalities principle," nationalities as units of race and religion, forming the basis of existence of a state and a homogenous nation.

References

Antisemitism in Romania
People from Neamț County
Romanian philosophers
Romanian Ministers of Education
19th-century Romanian poets
Romanian male poets
Romanian people of Armenian descent
Romanian socialists
1845 births
1882 deaths
Burials at Eternitatea cemetery
19th-century male writers
Romanian Ministers of Culture